The Ginglymostomatidae are a cosmopolitan family of carpet sharks known as nurse sharks, containing four species in three genera. Common in shallow, tropical and subtropical waters, these sharks are sluggish and docile bottom-dwellers. Nurse sharks typically attack humans only if directly threatened.

The name nurse shark is thought to be a corruption of nusse, a name which once referred to the catsharks of the family Scyliorhinidae. The nurse shark family name, Ginglymostomatidae, derives from the Greek words ginglymos meaning "hinge" and stoma meaning "mouth".

Description 
The first of the three species may reach a weight of 110 kg. Yellowish to dark brown in colour, nurse sharks have muscular pectoral fins, two spineless dorsal fins (the second of which is smaller) in line with the pelvic and anal fins, and a tail exceeding one quarter the shark's body length.

The mouth of nurse sharks is most distinctive; it is far ahead of the eyes and before the snout (subterminal), an indication of the bottom-dwelling (benthic) nature of these sharks. Also present on the lower jaw are two fleshy barbels, chemosensory organs which help the nurse sharks find prey hidden in the sediments. Behind each eye is a very small, circular opening called a spiracle, part of the shark's respiratory system. The serrated teeth are fan-shaped and independent; like other sharks, the teeth are continually replaced throughout the animal's life.

Habits 
Nurse sharks are nocturnal animals, spending the day in large inactive groups of up to 40 individuals. Hidden under submerged ledges or in crevices within the reef, the nurse sharks seem to prefer specific haunts and will return to them every day. By night, the sharks are largely solitary; they spend most of their time searching through the bottom sediments in search of food. Their diet consists primarily of crustaceans, molluscs, tunicates, and other fish, particularly stingrays.

Nurse sharks are thought to take advantage of dormant fish which would otherwise be too fast for the sharks to catch; although their small mouths limit the size of prey items, the sharks' large throat cavities are used as a sort of bellows valve. In this way, nurse sharks are able to suck in their prey.  Nurse sharks are also known to graze algae and coral.

Reproduction 
The mating season runs from late June to the end of July. All nurse sharks are aplacental viviparous, meaning the eggs develop and hatch within the body of the female, where the hatchlings develop further until live birth occurs. The gestation period is six months, with a typical litter of 30–40 pups. The mating cycle is biennial, as it takes 18 months for the female's ovaries to produce another batch of eggs. The young nurse sharks are born fully developed at about 30 cm long in Ginglymostoma cirratum. They possess a spotted coloration that fades with age.

Genera and species 
 Genus Ginglymostoma J. P. Müller & Henle, 1837
 Ginglymostoma cirratum Bonnaterre, 1788 (nurse shark)
 Ginglymostoma unami Del-Moral-Flores, Ramírez-Antonio, Angulo & Pérez-Ponce de León, 2015
 Genus Nebrius Rüppell, 1837
 Nebrius ferrugineus Lesson, 1831 (tawny nurse shark)
 Genus Pseudoginglymostoma Dingerkus, 1986
 Pseudoginglymostoma brevicaudatum Günther, 1867 (short-tail nurse shark)

See also 

 List of sharks

References

External links 
 FishBase entry on Ginglymostomatidae
 Nurse Shark Facts & Pictures
 MarineBio: Nurse shark, Ginglymostoma cirratum

 
Extant Late Jurassic first appearances
Ovoviviparous fish
Shark families
Taxa named by Theodore Gill